Stegastes diencaeus, the longfin damselfish, is a damselfish in the family Pomacentridae from the Western Atlantic. It occasionally makes its way into the aquarium trade. It grows to a size of 12.5 cm in length. Longfin damselfish have been reported to have a mutualistic relationship with mysid shrimp of the species Mysidium integrum. The interaction is described as a form of domestication with the shrimp providing nutrients for the algae farms the fish feed on and the fish providing protection from predators.

References

External links
 

diencaeus
Fish of the Western Atlantic
Taxa named by David Starr Jordan
Taxa named by Cloudsley Louis Rutter
Fish described in 1897